Massy Holdings Limited is a Trinidad and Tobago conglomerate operating in the Caribbean. It is publicly traded on the Trinidad and Tobago Stock Exchange as (NML) with a share value of (TT$5.7 billion) as of 2013.

References 

Conglomerate companies of Trinidad and Tobago